Venus Williams and Justin Gimelstob defeated Helena Suková and Cyril Suk in the final, 6–2, 6–1 to win the Mixed Doubles title at the 1998 Australian Open.

Manon Bollegraf and Rick Leach were the defending champions, but lost in the first round to Kristine Kunce and Jim Grabb.

Seeds

Draw

Final

Top half

Bottom half

References
 1998 Australian Open – Doubles draws and results at the International Tennis Federation

Mixed Doubles
Australian Open (tennis) by year – Mixed doubles